The 1975 NBA playoffs was the postseason tournament of the National Basketball Association's 1974–75 season. The tournament concluded with the Western Conference champion Golden State Warriors defeating the Eastern Conference champion Washington Bullets 4 games to 0 in the NBA Finals. Rick Barry was named NBA Finals MVP.  The Warriors won their third NBA title and first since 1956 as the Philadelphia Warriors.

The playoff format was revised again, as the result of which the first two finishers in each division were guaranteed playoff berths, along with the best third-place team from each conference. Once each conference's qualifiers were selected, they were seeded 1–5, with the fourth and fifth seeds playing a best-of-three series, with the victor advancing to play the first seed in a best-of-seven semifinal, while the second and third seeds played the other semifinal.

The eight-year-old Seattle SuperSonics made their playoff debut, winning the first playoff series in franchise history against the Detroit Pistons. Seattle would go on to make consecutive NBA Finals appearances in 1978 and 1979, winning the championship the latter year.

The Kansas City-Omaha Kings made their first playoff appearance since 1967 as the Cincinnati Royals, and the Houston Rockets made their first playoff appearance since 1969 as the San Diego Rockets.

The 1975 playoffs expanded the number of playoff qualifiers to 10; it would be expanded again to 12 in 1977 and again to its current number of 16 in 1984.

At the time, this was the closest the Chicago Bulls came to an NBA title, losing to the Warriors in the Western Conference Finals 4–3. This was their second and final Western Conference Finals appearance as they would move to the Eastern Conference in 1980. They would not reach the East Finals until 1989, and would not win a title until 1991.

Bracket

First round

Eastern Conference first round

(4) Houston Rockets vs. (5) New York Knicks

This was the first playoff meeting between these two teams.

Western Conference first round

(4) Seattle SuperSonics vs. (5) Detroit Pistons

This was the first playoff meeting between these two teams.

Conference semifinals

Eastern Conference semifinals

(1) Boston Celtics vs. (4) Houston Rockets

This was the first playoff meeting between these two teams.

(2) Washington Bullets vs. (3) Buffalo Braves

This was the first playoff meeting between these two teams.

Western Conference semifinals

(1) Golden State Warriors vs. (4) Seattle SuperSonics

This was the first playoff meeting between these two teams.

(2) Chicago Bulls vs. (3) Kansas City-Omaha Kings

This was the first playoff meeting between these two teams.

Conference finals

Eastern Conference finals

(1) Boston Celtics vs. (2) Washington Bullets

This was the first playoff meeting between these two teams.

Western Conference finals

(1) Golden State Warriors vs. (2) Chicago Bulls

 Chet Walker's final NBA game.

This was the first playoff meeting between these two teams.

NBA Finals: (E2) Washington Bullets vs. (W1) Golden State Warriors

This was the first playoff meeting between these two teams.

References

External links
Basketball-Reference.com's 1975 NBA Playoffs page

National Basketball Association playoffs
Playoffs

fi:NBA-kausi 1974–1975#Pudotuspelit